Trinitroethylorthoformate also known as TNEOF is an explosive with excellent chemical stability. It does not have hygroscopicity, does not dissolve in water, and does not react with acids. It decomposes in aqueous sodium hydroxide solution to release formaldehyde odor. The explosion point of TNEOF is 229 °C, though it begins to decompose at 190 °C. Its explosion heat is 6.3076 J/g and specific volume is 682 L/kg. Its structure is closely related to that of trinitroethylorthocarbonate (TNEOC). Both are highly explosive and very shock-sensitive, and may be dissolved in nitroalkanes to reduce their shock-sensitivity.

Synthesis 

Trinitroethanol is reacted with chloroform under a catalyst of FeCl3.
\overset{chloroform}{CHCl3} + \overset{Trinitroethanol}{3HOCH2C(NO2)3} ->[\ce{FeCl3}] {TNEOF} + 3HCl

References

Oxidizing agents